Tom van der Leegte (born 27 March 1977) is a Dutch former professional footballer. He formerly played for clubs like PSV Eindhoven and VfL Wolfsburg.

Career 
Van der Leegte made his debut as a 17-year-old for PSV. He was a member of the Dutch squad at the 1995 FIFA World Youth Championship. After two seasons for PSV he was loaned to RKC Waalwijk. After one season in Waalwijk he signed a contract with the club.

In the 2000–01 season, he was sold to FC Twente for 4 million gulden (approximately €1.8 million) where he played two seasons. In his third season at the club he had a loan spell for his second time at RKC Waalwijk where he finished the season. In the summer of 2003, he signed a contract at ADO Den Haag. After the first half of the 2005–06 campaign he signed a contract for VfL Wolfsburg. Among his teammates at VfL Wolfsburg, his fellow Dutch were Kevin Hofland and Rick Hoogendorp.

In May 2007, it was rumoured that van der Leegte would become Phillip Cocu's successor at PSV. A few days later PSV signed him for two years. He joined NAC Breda in September 2008 on a two-year contract.

Van der Leegte ended his career in March 2010, after long series of injuries.

After football, he worked in the family business VDL Groep and owned various companies. In 2017, he suffered a brain hemorrhage. In 2021 he became team manager at FC Eindhoven.

Honours
Twente
KNVB Cup: 2000–01

References 

1977 births
Living people
People from Bergeijk
Association football midfielders
Dutch footballers
Netherlands under-21 international footballers
Netherlands youth international footballers
Dutch expatriate footballers
Expatriate footballers in Germany
PSV Eindhoven players
RKC Waalwijk players
FC Twente players
ADO Den Haag players
VfL Wolfsburg players
NAC Breda players
Eredivisie players
Bundesliga players
Footballers from North Brabant
Dutch expatriate sportspeople in Germany